Mundari is an Eastern Nilotic language spoken by the Mundari people of South Sudan.

Writing system

Tones
 á - [˥]
 à - [˩]
 a - [˧]
 â - [˥˩]

References

 

Eastern Nilotic languages